Taizhou Rail Transit, is a metro system in Taizhou, Zhejiang province, China. The system is operated by Taizhou Rail Transit Construction and Development Co., Ltd. In the near term (Phase I), two lines, S1 and S2, are planned; in the long term, lines S3 and S4 are planned. The first phase of the plan was approved by the National Development and Reform Commission of the People's Republic of China in December 2014, and approved by the Zhejiang Provincial Development and Reform Commission in September 2016. Construction of Line S1 started in November 2016 and lasted until opening in December 2022.

Lines

Line S1 functions to locate the north-south express track passage in the central urban area of ​​Taizhou and the express track passage connecting Wenling and Yuhuan to the south of the urban area, connecting Toumen Port Area, Taizhou railway station, Wenling railway station and other important integrated transportation nodes.

Line S2 is functionally positioned as an east-west fast track passage in the central city of Taizhou, connecting Huangyan District, Taizhou West railway station, Jiaojiang District, Taizhou Railway Station, Taizhou Bay New District, Jinqing, Wenling East New District, Songmen, Shitang and other important blocks and stations, together with Line S1, built a cross-speed track in downtown Taizhou.

Long-term planning
Line S3 is functionally positioned as a rapid rail transit channel connecting Linhai's downtown area and Taizhou's downtown area, connecting important transportation nodes such as Linhai Railway Station, Linhai South Railway Station, and Taizhou Railway Station.

The M line is mainly a general rail line serving the "three districts and two cities". The function of M1 line is to connect the east-west rail transit line of Huangyan City and Jiaojiang City; the function of line M2 is the east-west rail transit line connecting Taizhou West Station, Huangyan City, Luqiao City, Taizhou Airport, and Taizhou Bay New District; the function of M3 line is It is positioned as a north-south rail transit line connecting Jiangbei New District, Jiaojiang District, Luqiao District, and Wenling City; the function of M4 line is to connect Huangyan District, Jianyang Lake, The rail transit line of Luqiao City and Taizhou Airport; the M5 line is functionally positioned as an east-west rail transit line within Wenling City, connecting Wenling Eastern New District, Ruoheng Town, Wenling City, Wenling Railway Station, Daxi Town, etc.

References

Rapid transit in China